Huarina is a location in the La Paz Department in Bolivia. It is the seat of the Huarina Municipality, one of the four municipalities of the Omasuyos Province. President of Peru Andrés de Santa Cruz was born here.

References

External links
Gobierno Autónomo Municipal de Huarina – Official site

Populated places in La Paz Department (Bolivia)